The BAT F.K.24 Baboon was a British two-seat training biplane produced by British Aerial Transport Company Limited of London during World War I.

Design and development
Using experience gained designing the Bantam, aircraft designer Frederick Koolhoven (assisted by Robert Noorduyn) designed an elementary trainer, a two-bay biplane known as the F.K.24 Baboon.

The aircraft had a flat-sided fuselage and an uncowled 170 hp (127 kW) ABC Wasp engine.  Six aircraft were planned but only one was built in July 1918.

The only notable act was when it won the Hendon Trophy Race over a 20-mile (32-km) circuit in July 1919 flown by Christopher Draper.  The Baboon was scrapped in 1920.

Specifications (F.K.24 Baboon)

See also

Notes

References

External links

Koolhoven aircraft

1910s British military trainer aircraft
Baboon
Biplanes
Single-engined tractor aircraft
Koolhoven aircraft
Aircraft first flown in 1918